Shylashri is an Indian actress who acted in Kannada, Tamil and Malayalam cinema. She was awarded the Rajyotsava Award in 2019 for her contributions to Kannada Cinema.

Shylashri is known to be one of 3 daughters of a classical musician, Veena Gnanambal, who taught music in Annamalai University.

Career 
Shylashri began her career with a small role in the Kannada film Sandhya Raga, released in 1966. She has acted as heroine and a supporting actress in many Kannada movies. She is well remembered for her role in the National Award-winning Kannada film Naguva Hoovu, released in 1971 where she plays a nurse who falls in love with a doctor but sacrifices her love for a cancer patient who loves her. She also wrote the story for the film, which was produced by R.N.R. Productions. She acted as one of the heroines opposite Dr. Rajkumar in Bangarada Hoovu and Jedara Bale. She has also appeared in a few Tamil films.

Marriage 
She married Kannada actor R.N.Sudarshan, with whom she acted in films such as Naguva Hoovu, Kadina Rahasya, Kallara Kalla and Malathi Madhava.

Partial filmography

Kannada

Tamil 
 Vennira Aadai (1965)
 Motor Sundaram Pillai (1966)
 Pandhyam (1967)
 Selva Magal (1967)
 Muthu Chippi (1968)
 Neeyum Naanum (1968)
 Athai Magal (1969)
 Aayiram Poi (1969)
 Pennai Vazha Vidungal (1969)
 Vaa Raja Vaa (1969)
 Subhadhinam (1969)
 Aindhu Laksham (1969)
 Thirumalai Thenkumari (1970)
 Dharisanam (1970)
 Thabalkaran Thangai (1970)
 Aathi Parasakthi (1971)
 Kurathi Magan (1972)

Malayalam 
 Kalanjukittiya Thankam (1964)
 Velutha Kathreena (1968)...Narthaki
 Nazhikakkallu (1970)
 Checkpost (1974)

Hindi 
 Waris (1969)

 Telugu 
 Bhale Abbayilu'' (1969)

References 

Actresses in Kannada cinema
Indian film actresses
Year of birth missing (living people)
Living people
20th-century Indian actresses
Actresses in Tamil cinema
Recipients of the Rajyotsava Award 2019
Actresses in Malayalam cinema
Actresses in Telugu cinema